The Rigmor and Carl Holst-Knudsen Award for Scientific Research is one of Denmark's oldest and most prestigious science prizes.  It was established in 1956, on the birthday of Carl Holst-Knudsen, who was at that time the Chairman of the Board at Aarhus University.  Originally worth 10 thousand Danish krones (DKK), it has grown to 100 thousand DKK in monetary value, and is awarded on 28 May annually.  It is given without application "as a mark of respect", to a researcher who has produced one or more significant results which show promise in future research.

Award Recipients since 2000

2012 : Professor Oluf Pedersen Borbye  from The Novo Nordisk Foundation Center for Basic Metabolic Research, University of Copenhagen; Professor Timo Teräsvirta from CREATES, Department of Economics at Aarhus University
2011: Professor Lise Hannestad, Department of Anthropology, Archaeology and Linguistics;  Professor Flemming Besenbacher, Interdisciplinary Nanoscience Center (INANO)
2010: Professor Bjarne Stroustrup, Texas A & M University, College of Engineering Chair, Professor in Computer Science; Professor Poul Nissen, Department of Molecular Biology
2009: Professor Jens F. Rehfeld, University of Copenhagen, Department of Clinical Biochemistry; Professor Bo Brummerstedt Iversen, Interdisciplinary Nanoscience Center and Department of Chemistry
2008: Professor Lene Hau, Harvard University Physics and Applied Physics; Associate Professor Andreas Roepstorff, Department of Anthropology, Archaeology and Linguistics; Professor Tim Bollerslev, Duke University, Economics
2007: Professor Dorthe Berntsen, Department of Psychology
2006: Associate Professor Maria Fabricius Hansen, Department of Art History
2005: Associate Professor Lars Albinus, Department of Systematic Theology
2004: Professor Klaus Mølmer, Department of Physics and Astronomy
2003: No award due to the distribution of 5 anniversary fund prices
2002: Professor Jens Christian Djuurhus,  Department of Experimental Clinical Research
2001: Professor Niels Haldrup, Department of Economics
2000: Associate Professor Peter Bugge, Slavic Department

References

Academic awards
Danish scientists
Aarhus University